Damian Foxall (born 7 March 1969) is an Irish sailor from County Kerry.

Personal details
Foxall is engaged to be married to French-Canadian Suzy-Ann who he has two children with Oisin and Neave and resides in Ireland.

Key Sailing Results
In addition to his offshore experience, Foxall has also been associated with dinghy, Olympic and America's Cup sailing.

Sailing career
Foxall has competed in ten round-the-world races which include four 1st place wins.

Solo Offshore Sailing
In 1997 Foxall became the first non-French entry to win the rookie class in the Single-handed offshore race - La Solitaire du Figaro.
He went on to confirm his success in 1998–1999 with a leg win, before changing to the ORMA 60` Trimaran class

Two Person Stopping Round the World Race
In the 2007/2008 Barcelona World Race, sailing with co-skipper Jean-Pierre Dick on the Open 60 Paprec-Virbac. He was subsequently described as a national hero and Ireland's top international sailor and was greeted at a reception at the Presidential Residence in Ireland

Crewed Stopping Round the World Race
In 2011 Foxall won the Volvo Ocean race with Team Groupama.

Other rtw events include 5 Volvo ocean races, and a World Record circumnavigation in early 2004 with Steve Fossett on the G-Class catamaran Cheyenne. He was named Sailor of the Month by Afloat Magazine in March 2004.

Damian is a sailor and sustainability manager with Team Vestas 11th Hour racing.
Competing in the Volvo Ocean Race, whilst promoting Ocean health and sustainability as part of the Team Vestas 11th Hour racing core goals.

Multihulls
His results in the ORMA 60' Trimaran class include: 1st - Transat Quebec-St Malo. 2st - ORMA circuit championship. 3 participations in Double Handed Transat Jacques Vabre, including 2nd, 3rd and a capsize. 2 Grand prix wins.

In 2019, Foxall made a 400-metre descent on skis from the summit of Ireland's highest mountain, Carrauntoohil (1,014 m), down the Shoulder of Corrán to the top of the steep gully known as the Devil's Ladder.

Conservation Work

Canadian Wildlife Federation
From 2012 to 2017 Damian worked as Recreation Education Manager for the Canadian Wildlife Federation and is an advocate for outdoor education, connecting people with the natural world to promote health and conservation.
Damian continues to collaborate with CWF especially promoting the WILD About Sports program as part of CWF education programs across Canada.

Outdoor Education

Damian Foxall is an active promoter of Ocean conservation.
Ambassador for :
Sailors for the sea; 
Race for water.
He also works to promote Best practices at afloat with regards to marine mammals.
See - When whales meet sails

Bibliography

Footnotes

External links
 

1969 births
Living people
Irish male sailors (sport)
Volvo Ocean Race sailors
Tornado class sailors
IMOCA 60 class sailors
Volvo 65 class sailors
Volvo 70 class sailors